McCluskieganj is a small hilly town in Jharkhand State, India, about  northwest of the capital, Ranchi. The town used to have a significant Anglo-Indian community. It is now a tourist place for its British era old mansions, hills and streams.

History
Ernest Timothy McCluskie, the Anglo Indian businessman from Kolkata visited the place and impressed by the environment and climate of the area. He decided to built a town for Anglo Indian and purchased the lands from king of Chotanagpur, Udai Pratap Nath Shah Deo. In 1932, he   sent circulars to nearly 200,000 Anglo-Indians in India inviting them to settle there. It was founded by the Colonisation Society of India in 1933 as a homeland or "Mooluk" for Anglo-Indians. Anglo-Indians could buy Shares in this co-operative, the Colonisation Society of India - which in turn would allot them a plot of land. It became home to 400 Anglo-Indian families within ten years.  Of the nearly 300 original settlers, only 20 families remain, as most of the Anglo-Indian community left after World War II.

Now, the population of the town is around 3000.

Geography
McCluskieganj is located at the distance of around 60 km North West from state capital of Jharkhand, Ranchi in Khelari block. It is located at alltitude of 450 metre. It is located near the Dugadugi river which is tributary of Damodar River. Jhunjhunia waterfall located near Macluskieganj.

Climate
The climate of McCluskieganj is ideal with low humidity. McCluskieganj witnesses frost during winter which cover grass, vehicles and roofs. During cold wave, It record temperature around freezing points. In 2013, it recorded 1.5° Celsius in month of January.

Infrastructure

Educational institution
Adarsh High school, since 1985.
Don Bosco Academy, since 1997. 
Saraswati Shishu Vidya Mandir, McCluskieganj, primary school since 1998.
St. Teresa's Primary School.
Janet Academy.
Delhi Public International School.
McCluskieganj Inter college, since 2012.

Transport
National Highway 39 (Ranchi-Daltonganj), an important roadway in Ranchi district, passes near McCluskieganj. McCluskieganj railway station located in McCluskieganj.

Attractions 
McCluskeiganj Gurudwara and Temple: lying in the same complex is a place of integrity and shows brotherhood of India.McCluskeiganj Mosque: It is just besides the Gurudwara and Temple complex.St. John's Church: A historical place built by Anglo-Indians during British rule.

In popular culture
The town was the inspiration for the Hindi novel Maikluskiganj by journalist-writer Vikas Kumar Jha, which was translated into English by Mahasweta Ghosh in 2005.

McCluskieganj is also the setting for the 2016 film A Death in the Gunj, which is Konkona Sen Sharma's directorial debut, and set in 1979.

References

External links

 Time Magazine story about McCluskieganj
 Mccluskieganj (MINI London) Facebook Account
 McCluskie's Ganj: The Lost Home of The Anglos (2014): short video documentary on McCluskieganj by Dhiraj Singh

Cities and towns in Ranchi district
Settlement schemes in the British Empire
Settlement schemes in Asia